Mike Potter (July 4, 1949 – October 31, 2022) was a NASCAR driver. He was born on July 4, 1949, and lived in Johnson City, Tennessee.

Over the course of his Winston Cup Series career, Potter raced 60 races. Every season he raced was part-time. The most races he ran in a season was 11 in both 1983 and 1992. 1983 was his official year as a rookie, because he ran more than 8 races. His best career finish was a 15th at Nashville Speedway in 1981.

In the early 2000s he ran a few races in the Busch Series, primarily for Means Racing during 2003. Potter attempted five races in 2004 for Johnny Davis Motorsports but only made two of them.

Potter returned to the NASCAR Busch Series in 2007. He attempted two races in the #00 Chevrolet. The car was a third entry from DDL Motorsports, a team co-owned by Johnny Davis. Mike made the field for Milwaukee, his first race back, but missed the other race he attempted at Watkins Glen.

In 2008, Mike ran a variety of races for Johnny Davis Motorsports. His first race in 2008 was at his home track of Bristol. He ended up finishing last in the #0 Chevrolet, a Johnny Davis Motorsports secondary car. After Kertus Davis left the team, Potter took over the reins of the #01 SponsorDavis.com Chevrolet, the team's primary entry, for a couple of races. Mike ended up finishing a respectable 29th at the Camping World RV Sells 200 in June.

Besides NASCAR, Potter also had experience in many other forms of stock car racing, including Hooters Pro Cup.

Potter died on October 31, 2022, at the age of 73.

Motorsports career results

NASCAR
(key) (Bold – Pole position awarded by qualifying time. Italics – Pole position earned by points standings or practice time. * – Most laps led.)

Winston Cup Series

Daytona 500

Nationwide Series

ARCA Re/Max Series
(key) (Bold – Pole position awarded by qualifying time. Italics – Pole position earned by points standings or practice time. * – Most laps led.)

References

External links
 

1949 births
2022 deaths
NASCAR drivers
ARCA Menards Series drivers
CARS Tour drivers
People from Johnson City, Tennessee
Racing drivers from Tennessee